Hedong Township is a township of Jinchuan County, in the southwest of Ngawa Tibetan and Qiang Autonomous Prefecture in northwestern Sichuan province, China, located  southwest of the county seat. , it has four villages under its administration.

References 

Township-level divisions of Sichuan
Jinchuan County